Research Institute for Healthcare and Medical Management of Moscow Healthcare Department (NIIOZMM DZM) is a leading scientific organization of Moscow healthcare system that conducts research in healthcare development, continuous improvement and efficiency of management models in healthcare.

History 
Research Institute NIIOZMM is a scientific institution of Moscow Healthcare Department and successor to the Moscow Research Institute of Medical Ecology (MNIIME), founded in 1996.
The Research Institute was founded on October 2, 2014. The Institute's founder is Moscow government whose functions and powers as founder are performed by Moscow Healthcare Department.

General information 
Research Institute NIIOZMM is an expert organization that provides support for management decision-making in Moscow healthcare,
The Institute’s activities are aimed at the emergence of new knowledge in the healthcare system and medical management, the creation of conditions for a complete innovation cycle of healthcare technologies, their pharmacoeconomic assessment and implementation. The Institute's model allows for close integration between research and clinical practice in Moscow.

Activities 
 Research healthcare management and public health: forecast of health development and socio-demographic indicators; human resources development; health economics; pharmacoeconomics research; telemedicine, improving the efficiency of the healthcare system and optimal resource management.
 Medical and social research in healthcare.
 Technological forecasting and assessment of health technologies
 Analytics and medical statistics.
 Expert support of clinical activities in Moscow healthcare.
 Digitalization of healthcare and information security of Moscow healthcare.
 Education.
 Publishing and media communications.

The Research Institute has an Academic Council that includes leading Moscow experts in healthcare and medical management

NIIOZMM is an active participant in digitalization of Moscow healthcare and is the main developer of the public health information system, which allows one not only to collect statistical data on Moscow healthcare development, but also to make informed management decisions. The Institute has developed and maintains digital patient registers. Most of the operational monitoring of national and regional projects is done by the Institute.

Division of healthcare organization analyzes management of medical care in institutions of Moscow Healthcare Department and proposes how it can be improved and acts as mediator between institutions and the Department on these subjects. The Division develops protocols for managing patients with various diseases, conducts research aimed at improving the provision of medical care to the population, preventing diseases and forming a healthy lifestyle.

Division of public health research studies the patterns of public health, its relationship with Moscow healthcare system. Specialists of the Division analyze and evaluate public health indicators in Moscow. Based on the results obtained, they develop concept, assess effectiveness and provide scientific and methodological support of activities aimed at improving the health status of the population of Moscow and raising awareness of residents on healthy lifestyles and disease prevention

Division of methodology for conducting an audit of the effectiveness of healthcare institutions develops standardized performance indicators for medical organizations and methods of their use for effective management of available resources (Quality Standard for Resource Management (SKUR ). Specialists summarize the performance results of medical organizations: they assesses the effectiveness of financial, human, property and other resources management, and examine the management quality of institutions in each of these areas, taking into account their specifics.

Organizational and methodological divisions in 30 specialties coordinate and develop the activities of medical organizations according to the guidelines of Moscow Healthcare Department and Chief Specialists in the corresponding areas.

Center for Medical Statistics of the Institute constantly collects statistical data from medical organizations in Moscow. Software for remote submission of statistical reports has been developed and implemented, and the Institute developed a course in statistical accounting and reporting and continuously provides training for new specialists.

The Institute has education programs both in additional professional (continuous medical) education, and in the main professional education, i.e. postgraduate studies and residency. Courses on quality management system, healthcare organization, medical statistics, and medical communications are the permanent programs. On the basis of NIIOZMM, professional development of speech therapists, transfusiologists, obstetricians and gynecologists and doctors of other specialties is carried out. Residency and postgraduate programs are available for Health Organization and public health (31.08.71 and 14.02.03, accordingly) specialty.

The Research Institute coordinates international training for medical professionals from Moscow healthcare organizations in Israel, South Korea, Belgium, Germany, Switzerland, Italy, the Czech Republic and other countries.
In 2018, the Telemedicine division was created to study the possibilities of using new technologies in medical organizations of Moscow Healthcare Department.

Moscow Medicine mass media 
Moscow Medicine Journal has been published bimonthly since 2014. The Journal focuses on the latest treatment methods, research results, innovative management and medical technologies in Moscow healthcare, briefs from scientific conferences and advanced clinical know-how. The Editorial Board is reviewing publications and interacting with international scientific databases.

Newspaper Moscow medicine. Cito has been published weekly since 2017. Each issue contains reports, clinical case reviews, interviews with leading doctors and the best experts in Moscow healthcare, successful patient stories, and latest news.

Moscow Medicine. Video is dedicated to creating video content for both medical specialists (video lectures, TEDTalk-style presentations, etc.) and for a wide audience (educational animated videos on popular topics, virtual tours of Moscow clinics, including visits to high-tech operations, medical museums, etc.).

References

External links 
Official website
ELibrary.ru

Medical research institutes in Russia
2014 establishments in Russia